The second season of The Rockford Files originally aired Fridays at 9:00-10:00 pm on NBC from September 12, 1975 to March 19, 1976.

Episodes

1975 American television seasons
1976 American television seasons
The Rockford Files seasons